Anthurium formosum is a species of plant in the genus Anthurium native to Central and South America. Epiphytic or terrestrial, it is found from Nicaragua to Colombia and northwest Venezuela.  

Its spadix is coated with a wax smelling of spearmint, which attracts euglossine bees.

References

formosum
Plants described in 1858